Ostrea edulis, commonly known as the European flat oyster, is a species of oyster native to Europe. In Britain and Ireland, regional names include Colchester native oyster, mud oyster, or edible oyster. In France, Ostrea edulis are known as huîtres plates (flat oysters) except for those that come from the Belon River estuary in Brittany, France, which are known as Belons.

The fossil record of this species dates back to the Miocene (age range: 15.97 million years ago to present day). Fossils have been found in Belgium, Italy, the Netherlands, Egypt, Greece, Spain, the United Kingdom, Austria, France and Germany.

Description

Shells are oval or pear shaped, white, yellowish or cream in colour, with a rough surface showing pale brown or bluish concentric bands on the right valve. The two valves are quite different in shape and size, as the left one is concave and fixed to the substratum, while the right one is almost flat and fits inside the left. The inner surface is smooth, whitish or bluish-grey.

Biology
Ostrea edulis are gregarious molluscs that start their lives as males. They mature sexually after eight–ten months and may change sex depending on the water temperature. Usually the lifespan can reach about six years, with a maximum of 15 years. Adult oysters feed by filtration.

Distribution
The species naturally ranges along the western and southern coasts of Europe from Norway to Morocco and including most of the British Isles and the Mediterranean coast.  Naturally viable populations have appeared in eastern North America from Maine to Rhode Island subsequent to artificial introduction in the 1940s and 1950s.

Habitat
Ostrea edulis can be found in estuarine and shallow coastal water with hard substrata of mud and rocks.

Human use
Ostrea edulis has been harvested throughout Europe as an important food source since prehistory. During Roman occupation of Britain O. edulis oysters were exported in large quantities back to Italy. However, due to their robust nature and ease of cultivation the Pacific oysters, Crassostrea gigas, account for more than 75 percent of Europe's oyster production.

European flat oysters are famously grown in Brittany, France. The true Belon oyster is cultivated in the Belon River, France, and has the AOC protected name. In the 1950s, Dutch scientists artificially introduced Belon oyster seed into the waters around Maine in hopes to establish a viable stock. The initial project was abandoned but ten years later natural colonies of flat oysters were found in the wild. Many North American suppliers use the name 'Belon' to species that are found in the wild throughout the United States.

Ostrea edulis is now also being maricultured in the states of California, Maine, and Washington in the United States. The species once dominated European oyster production but disease, pollution, and overfishing sharply reduced the harvest. Currently, there are efforts across Germany, the UK, France, Scotland, and Wales to restore oyster reefs and maintain the habitat.

U.S. oyster growers farm O. edulis in small quantities on both coasts. They are prized for their unique tannic seawater flavour, sometimes described as dry and metallic, and are more expensive than other American oysters.  The flavour is considered excellent for eating raw on the half shell.

The adductor muscle of the European flat in combination with the shape of the shell results in a somewhat weaker seal compared with other oyster species. It is common practice to use rubber bands to prevent oysters from spilling their liquor and dehydrating in storage before consumption.

See also

References

External links

 UK Biodiversity Action Plan

Ostrea
Commercial molluscs

Molluscs described in 1758
Taxa named by Carl Linnaeus